Mount Jupiter is a  mountain summit in the Olympic Mountains and is located in Jefferson County of Washington state. It is situated in The Brothers Wilderness on land managed by Olympic National Forest. Mount Jupiter is easy to identify from Seattle, since it appears as the prominent peak between The Brothers and Mount Constance. The Jupiter name was applied by the Seattle Press Expedition in an effort to link the peak with the Greco-Roman mythological names associated with Mount Olympus. Jupiter was a Roman god on Olympus.

Climate

Based on the Köppen climate classification, Mount Jupiter is located in the marine west coast climate zone of western North America. Most weather fronts originate in the Pacific Ocean, and travel northeast toward the Olympic Mountains. As fronts approach, they are forced upward by the peaks of the Olympic Range, causing them to drop their moisture in the form of rain or snowfall (Orographic lift). As a result, the Olympics experience high precipitation, especially during the winter months. Because of maritime influence, snow tends to be wet and heavy, resulting in avalanche danger. During winter months, weather is usually cloudy, but due to high pressure systems over the Pacific Ocean that intensify during summer months, there is often little or no cloud cover during the summer. In terms of favorable weather, June to October are the best months for hiking up the mountain. Precipitation runoff from the north side of the mountain drains into the Dosewallips River, whereas the south side drains into the Duckabush River.

See also
 The Brothers Wilderness
 Olympic Mountains

References

External links
 The Brothers Wilderness U.S. Forest Service
 Mount Jupiter weather: Mountain Forecast
 Mt. Jupiter Trail #809: US Forest Service

Olympic Mountains
Mountains of Jefferson County, Washington
Mountains of Washington (state)